Dickies Arena is a 14,000-seat multipurpose American arena, located within the Will Rogers Memorial Center in Fort Worth, Texas. The venue hosted a public ribbon cutting on October 26, 2019. The first event held was a Twenty One Pilots concert on November 8, 2019.

The facility is the result of a public-private partnership between Fort Worth, Tarrant County, the state of Texas, and a group of private-sector participants, including foundations, individuals, and organizations. The arena was designed by the 2015 Driehaus Prize winner David M. Schwarz and is owned by Fort Worth and managed by the not-for-profit Multipurpose Arena Fort Worth (MAFW).

It hosts concerts, sporting events, and family entertainment, and serves as the home of the Professional Rodeo Cowboys Association’s Fort Worth Stock Show Rodeo and Xtreme Bulls since 2020 and the Professional Bull Riders’ World Finals since 2022. The Fort Worth Stock Show and other equestrian events are held at the adjacent Will Rogers Memorial Center.

Naming
On April 18, 2017 as part of the "Let The Dirt Fly" groundbreaking ceremony, MAFW and Dickies announced a surprise partnership that established Dickies as the naming rights partner for the venue. The Fort Worth-based company is the world's leading performance workwear brand.

Seating
With a wide variety of seating configurations, the arena is able to accommodate many styles of events. There will be 3 standard levels: plaza level (100-sections), suite and loge box level, and gallery level (200-sections); and 1 additional with floor seating.

Acoustics
While in the design phase, Dickies Arena was built with the intent of having the sound of a concert hall.  Great care was given to minimize or eliminate "echo."

Center-hung scoreboard
Dickies Arena has the second-largest, continuous 360-degree screen in North America.  The scoreboard extends past the width of the basketball court. 

The board measures 105 feet across and 26 feet tall.

There are 1.2 million LEDs installed on the board.

Events

Concerts

Cancelled shows

Sports
The arena hosted its first Hot Wheels Monster Truck Live show on November 15 & 16, 2019.
TCU hosted the first sporting event in Dickies Arena with a non-conference basketball game against USC on December 6, 2019.
Since 2020, Dickies Arena has been home to the rodeo section of the Fort Worth Stock Show and Rodeo.
2021 and 2022 NCAA Women's Gymnastics Championship
The American Athletic Conference will host its annual American Athletic Conference men's basketball tournament (2020, 2021, 2022) and American Athletic Conference women's basketball tournament (2021, 2022) at Dickies Arena.
Dickies Arena hosted first and second-round games during the 2022 NCAA Division I men's basketball tournament.
On July 22, 2020, the National Lacrosse League announced it would be expanding to Fort Worth for the 2021–22 season, playing its home games at Dickies Arena.  
The Professional Bull Riders (PBR) hosted a regular-season Unleash the Beast Series event at Dickies Arena on August 29th and 30th, 2020. The event returned on August 28th and 29th, 2021. Since 2022, Dickies Arena has been the home of the PBR World Finals, now held every May after taking place for many years in the autumn in Las Vegas, Nevada. Also since 2022, Dickies Arena has been the home venue of the PBR’s Texas Rattlers during the PBR Team Series season held every summer through autumn.  
On March 20, 2021, Boxing hosted Vergil Ortiz Jr. vs Maurice Hooker Ortiz Jr won by 7th round TKO to Win the WBO International welterweight title.
On July 18, 2021, WWE presented the 2021 Money in the Bank pay-per-view event from Dickies Arena, making it the first WWE pay-per-view to take place outside of Florida since the 2020 Elimination Chamber event prior to the COVID-19 pandemic.
From August 4 through August 14, Dickies Arena hosted the 2022 Rocket League World Championship, a premier Esports tournament.
From October 31 through November 7, Dickies Arena hosted the 2022 WTA Finals.

References

External links

David M. Schwarz buildings
Entertainment venues in Texas
Panther City LC
Rodeo venues in the United States
Sports venues completed in 2019
Sports venues in Fort Worth, Texas